Sean Anthony Frye (born September 16, 1966) is an American former child actor. His best-known role was as Steve, the sunglass-toting friend of Elliott's older brother in E.T. the Extra-Terrestrial.

His last made-for-television film was Toughlove (1985), where he played the role of a drug-involved teenager whose addiction caused him to steal from his family.  Frye's last feature film was Molly Ringwald's For Keeps (1988) about teen-age pregnancy.

Beyond acting, Frye was wardrobe consultant on the 1983 film Valley Girl.

Frye was born in Hollywood, California. Actress Soleil Moon Frye is his half-sister; their father was actor Virgil Frye.

Filmography

Film
 Fun with Dick and Jane (1977) as Billy
 The Awakening Land (1978) as Resolve Wheeler
 Loose Shoes (1980) as Bobby the S.T.O.P.-I.T. Poster Boy
 E.T. the Extra-Terrestrial (1982) as Steve 
 This Is Spinal Tap (1984) as Jordan St. Hubbins, David's Punk Rocker Son (scenes deleted)
 Real Genius (1985) as Boy at Science Fair
 For Keeps (1988) as Wee Willy

Television
 Emergency! (1 episode, 1974) as Boy
 A Special Olivia Newton-John (1976) as Nigel
 A Circle of Children (1977) as Sean
 The Awakening Land (2 episodes, 1978) as Resolve Wheeler
 Little House on the Prairie (2 episodes, 1979) as Jason
 Act of Violence (1979) as Jamie
 ABC Afterschool Special (1 episode, 1985) as Punk Boyfriend
 Toughlove (1985) as Tim

References

External links
 
 

1966 births
American male child actors
American male film actors
Living people
Male actors from Hollywood, Los Angeles